Mitrella moleculina is a species of sea snail, a marine gastropod mollusk in the family Columbellidae, the dove snails. This species occurs in the Indian Ocean off Aldabra and Madagascar and in the seas off the Philippines, Korea, Taiwan, and Japan. The shell ranges between 6 and 9 millimeters in length.

Mitrella moleculina are broadcast spawners, releasing their gametes (sperm and eggs) into open water for external fertilisation.

References

 Dautzenberg, Ph. (1929). Mollusques testaces marins de Madagascar. Faune des Colonies Francaises, Tome III
 Liu, J.Y. [Ruiyu] (ed.). (2008). Checklist of marine biota of China seas. China Science Press. 1267 pp.
 Kilburn R.N. & Marais J.P. (2010) Columbellidae. Pp. 60–104, in: Marais A.P. & Seccombe A.D. (eds), Identification guide to the seashells of South Africa. Volume 1. Groenkloof: Centre for Molluscan Studies. 376 pp.

External links
 Duclos P.L. (1840). Histoire naturelle générale et particulière de tous les genres de coquilles univalves marines a l'état vivant et fossile, publiée par monographie. Genre Colombelle. Didot, Paris. 13 pl
 Brazier, J. (1877) Shells collected during the Chevert Expedition. Proceedings of the Linnean Society of New South Wales, 1, 224–240

moleculina
Gastropods described in 1846